Martinska Ves  may refer to:

 Martinska Ves, Sisak-Moslavina County, a village in Croatia
 Martinska Ves, Zagreb County, a village in Croatia